Ring Mountain is an elevated landform on the Tiburon Peninsula in Marin County, California. This mountain was named for George E. Ring, who served as a Marin County Supervisor from 1895 to 1903.

A number of rare and endangered flora inhabit Ring Mountain. The mountain's twin summits consist of serpentinite, a rock which is very high in magnesium, producing soils of unusual chemistry (serpentine soil).  The landscape is strewn with many sizable boulders which exhibit a variety of lithologies including high-pressure metamorphic rocks of amphibolite, blueschist, greenschist, and eclogite grade.

Native American pecked curvilinear nucleated petroglyphs created by the Coast Miwok people are also found here.

Geology

Ring Mountain is a unique geological site, where rocks that formed in ancient subduction zones can be observed. Serpentinized peridotite crops out on the two summits of the mountain, and the steep upper slopes are underlain by serpentinite-matrix mélange.  The melange contains blocks of high-pressure, low-temperature metamorphic rocks associated with subduction zone metamorphism. Melanges of this general style are known from the Franciscan Complex, but this melange is particularly notable for the size and variety of the metamorphic blocks.  Dating of metamorphic minerals in the blocks indicates that they were produced over a protracted history of subduction which began ~175 million years ago.  The blocks preserve mineral assemblages characteristic of greenschist facies, blueschist facies, amphibolite facies, and eclogite facies metamorphism  and is the type location of the mineral Lawsonite.  The lower slopes are underlain by greywacke sandstones and shales of prehnite-pumpellyite metamorphic grade, but the contact between the sandstones and the serpentinite-matrix melange is not exposed.  Landslides and their deposits are abundant on Ring Mountain, for example at Triangle Marsh, and they carry serpentinite and metamorphic blocks far downslope from their in situ positions.

The origins of the serpentinite-matrix melange, and the mechanism of mixing the metamorphic blocks of different ages and apparent thermal-burial histories, has been a matter of debate. Some authors argue that the metamorphic rocks were exposed at the surface, eroded and re-deposited into a subduction trench to form the melange as an olistostrome.  Others interpret the melange as having formed in a subduction plate boundary where blocks of meta-basalt from the downgoing plate were mixed with serpentine from the upper plate mantle.

Ring Mountain is one of the featured field trips found in the Streetcar 2 Subduction online field trip guide series released in December 2019 by the American Geophysical Union.

Animal life 

Though Ring Mountain is an island ecosystem surrounded by Highway 101 and suburbs, it hosts a variety of wildlife, including coyotes, deer, skunks, and many birds and reptiles.

Plant life
Ring Mountain is the home of the only population of Tiburon mariposa lily in the world. This flower grows near the summit of the mountain in the grassy areas. Ring Mountain is also home to other rare plants such as the Tiburon jewelflower and the Tiburon paintbrush. The Nature Conservancy bought the land around the mountain and has been responsible for preserving the rare native plant species of the area.

Recreation 
Ring Mountain is a popular hiking area and provides spectacular 360 degree views of the northern Bay Area.

See also 
 Calochortus tiburonensis
 Castilleja neglecta
 Streptanthus niger
 Triangle Marsh
 Category: Endemic flora of California

References

External links 
 
 Ring Mountain Preserve

Mountains of the San Francisco Bay Area
Mountains of Marin County, California
Petroglyphs in California
Miwok
Native American history of California
Natural history of California
Mountains of Northern California